I Believe in You is the tenth studio by American country music artist Don Williams. It was released on August 4, 1980 via MCA Records. The album includes the singles "I Believe in You" and "Falling Again".

Track listing

Chart performance

References

1980 albums
Don Williams albums
Albums produced by Garth Fundis
MCA Records albums